Lanotte is a surname. Notable people with the surname include:

 Alessio Lanotte (born 1992), Italian footballer
 Johan Vande Lanotte (born 1955), Belgian politician
 Luca Lanotte (born 1985), Italian ice dancer

See also
 Lanette
 La Notte